The 2012 Bethune–Cookman Wildcats football team represented Bethune-Cookman University in the 2012 NCAA Division I FCS football season. They were led by third-year head coach Brian Jenkins and played their home games at Municipal Stadium. They are a member of the Mid-Eastern Athletic Conference (MEAC). They finished the season 9–3, 8–0 in MEAC play win the conference title. They earned the MEAC's automatic bid into the FCS playoffs where they lost in the first round to Coastal Carolina.

Schedule

References

Bethune-Cookman
Bethune–Cookman Wildcats football seasons
Mid-Eastern Athletic Conference football champion seasons
Bethune-Cookman